This article lists fish commonly kept in aquariums and ponds.

Cypriniformes

Botiidae

Ambastaia
 Ambastaia sidthimunki

Botia
 Botia almorhae
 Botia striata

Chromobotia
 Chromobotia macracanthus

Yasuhikotakia
 Yasuhikotakia modesta
 Yasuhikotakia mortlei

Cyprinidae

Barbus
 Barbus oligolepis
 Barbus peloponnesius
 Barbus roloffi
 Barbus walkerie

Boraras 

 Boraras maculata
 Boraras brigittae
 Boraras merah
 Boraras urophthalmoides 
 Boraras naevus  
 Boraras micros

Danio
 Danio aequipinnatus
 Danio albolineatus
 Danio kyathit
 Danio kerri
 Danio rerio

Tanichthys
Tanichthys micagemmae
Tanichthys albonubes

Rasbora
 Rasbora borapetensis
 Rasbora caudimaculata
 Rasbora daniconius
 Rasbora einthovenii
 Rasbora elegans
 Rasbora kalochroma
 Rasbora trilineata

Balantiocheilos
 Balantiocheilos melanopterus

Crossocheilus 
 Crossocheilus oblongus

Epalzeorhynchos
 Epalzeorhynchos bicolor
 Epalzeorhynchos frenatum

Labeo
 Labeo chrysophekadion

Leptobarbus
 Leptobarbus hoevenii

Luciosoma
 Luciosoma setigerum

Osteochilus
 Osteochilus vittatus

Carassius
 Carassius auratus

Cyprinus
 Cyprinus carpio

Cyprinella
 Cyprinella lutrensis

Acanthorhodeus
 Acanthorhodeus chankaensis

Phoxinus
 Phoxinus phoxinus

Pimephales
 Pimephales promelas

Rhodeus
 Rhodeus ocellatus
 Rhodeus sericeus

Sarcocheilichthys
 Sarcocheilichthys sinensis

Scardinius
 Scardinius erythrophthalmus

Gyrinocheilidae

Gyrinocheilus
Gyrinocheilus aymonieri

Cobitidae

Cobitis
Cobitis biwae

Acantopsis
Acantopsis dialuzona

Misgurnus
Misgurnus anguillicaudatus

Pangio
 Pangio oblonga
 Pangio kuhlii

Catostomidae

Myxocyprinus
Myxocyprinus asiaticus sinensis

Characiformes

Characidae

Brachychalcinus
 Brachychalcinus orbicularis

Gymnocorymbus
 Gymnocorymbus ternetzi

Hasemania
 Hasemania nana

Hemigrammus
 Hemigrammus erythrozonus
 Hemigrammus ocellifer
 Hemigrammus pulcher
 Hemigrammus rhodostomus

Hyphessobrycon
 Hyphessobrycon anisitsi
 Hyphessobrycon bifasciatus
 Hyphessobrycon erythrostigma
 Hyphessobrycon eques
 Hyphessobrycon flammeus
 Hyphessobrycon herbertaxelrodi
 Hyphessobrycon heterorhabdus
 Hyphessobrycon megalopterus
 Hyphessobrycon pulchripinnis
 Hyphessobrycon rosaceus
 Hyphessobrycon sweglesi

Nematobrycon
 Nematobrycon palmeri

Paracheirodon
 Paracheirodon axelrodi
 Paracheirodon innesi

Pristella
 Pristella maxillaris

Aphyocharax
 Aphyocharax anisitsi

Arnoldichthys
 Arnoldichthys spilopterus

Astyanax
 Astyanax fasciatus mexicanus

Tetragonopterus
 Tetragonopterus chalceus

Moenkhausia
 Moenkhausia oligolepis
 Moenkhausia pittieri

Prionobrama
 Prionobrama filigera

Pseudocorynopoma
 Pseudocorynopoma doriae

Thayeria
 Thayeria boehlkei

Anostomidae

Abramites
Abramites hypselonotus

Anostomus
Anostomus anostomus
Anostomus ternetzi

Leporinus
Leporinus desmotes
Leporinus frederici
Leporinus octofasciatum
Leporinus arcus

Gasteropelecidae

Carnegiella
Carnegiella marthae
Carnegiella strigata
Carnegiella myersi

Gasteropelecus
Gasteropelecus sternicla

Thoracocharax
Thoracocharax stellatus

Chalcenidae

Chalcenus
Chalcenus macrolepidotus

Curimatidae

Chilodus
Chilodus Punctatus

Serrasalminae

Colossoma
Colossoma bidens

Metynnis
Metynnis hypsauchen

Mylossoma
Mylossoma pluriventre

Serrasalmus
Serrasalmus nattereri

Lebiasinidae

Copeina
Copeina guttata

Copella
Copella arnoldi

Nannostomus
Nannostomus beckfordi
Nannostomus beckfordi
Nannostomus eques
Nannostomus trifasciatus
Nannostomus unifasciatus

Pyrrhulina
Pyrrhulina beni
Pyrrhulina filamentosa

Distichodontidae

Distichodus
Distichodus affinis
Distichodus lussoso
Distichodus noboli
Distichodus sexfasciatus

Alestidae

Lepidarchus
Lepidarchus adonis

Moenkhausia
Moenkhausia oligolepis
Moenkhausia pittieri

Citharinidae

Nannaethiops
Nannaethiops unitaeniatus

Perciformes

Cichlidae

Anomalachromis
Anomalachromis thomasi

Apistogramma
Apistogramma agassizi
Apistogramma cacatuoides
Apistogramma macmasteri
Apistogramma nijsseni
Apistogramma trifasciatum

Grenicara
Crenicara filamentosa

Nannacara
Nannacara anomala

Nanochromis
Nanochromis nudiceps

Papiliochromis
Papiliochromis ramirezi

Pelvicachromis
Pelvicachromis pulcher

Aequidens
Aequidens maronii
Aequidens pulcher
Aequidens rivulatus
Aequidens curviceps

Astronotus
Astronotus ocellatus

Cichlasoma
Cichlasoma citrinellum
Cichlasoma dovii
Cichlasoma maculicauda
Cichlasoma cyanoguttatum
Cichlasoma managuense
Cichlasoma nigrofasciatum
Cichlasoma severum
Cichlasoma festivum

Grenicichla
Grenicichla lepidota

Etroplus
Etroplus maculatus

Geophagus
Geophagus daemon

Hemichromis
Hemichromis bimaculatus

Parapetenia
Parapetenia festae

Pterophyllum
Pterophyllum altum
Pterophyllum scalare

Symphysodon
Symphysodon aequifasciatus

Thorichthys
Thorichthys meeki

Tilapia
Tilapia mariae

Aulonacara
Aulonacara nyassae

Cyprichromis
Cyprichromis leptosoma

Cyrtocara
Cyrtocara ahli
Cyrtocara polystigma

Julidochromis
Julidochromis dickfeldi
Julidochromis marlierie
Julidochromis transcriptus
Julidochromis regani

Labeotropheus
Labeotropheus fuelleborni

Lethrinops
Lethrinops furcifer

Melanochromis
Melanochromis auratus
Melanochromis chipokae
Melanochromis johanni

Neolamprologus
Neolamprologus brichardi
Neolamprologus leleupi

Pseudotropheus
Pseudotropheus elongatus
Pseudotropheus lombardoi
Pseudotropheus tropheops
Pseudotropheus zebra

Tropheus
Tropheus moorii

Haplochromis
Haplochromis macrostoma

Anabantidae

Anabas
Anabas testudineus

Ctenopoma
Ctenopoma acutirostre
Ctenopoma ansorgei
Ctenopoma fasciolatum
Ctenopoma oxyrhynchus

Osphronemidae

Belontia
Belontia signata

Betta
Betta bellica
Betta imbellis
Betta splendens
Betta pugnax
Betta coccina

Colisa
Colisa fasciata
Colisa labiosa
Colisa lalia

Macropodus
Macropodus cupanus

Osphronemus
Osphronemus goramy

Sphaerichthys
Sphaerichthys osphromenoides

Trichopodus
Trichopodus cantoris
Trichopodus leerii
Trichopodus microlepis
Trichopodus pectoralis
Trichopodus trichopterus

Trichopsis
Trichopsis vittatus

Helostomatidae

Helostoma
Helostoma temmincki

Nandidae

Badis
Badis badis

Centropomidae

Chanda
Chanda ranga

Channidae

Channa
Channa asiatica

Lobotidae

Datnioides
Datnioides microlepis

Dario 

 Dario dario
 Dario sp. 'Myanmar'
Dario hysginon

Eleotridae

Hypseleotris
Hypseleotris compressus

Nandidae

Monocirrhus
Monocirrhus polyacanthus

Monodactylidae

Monodactylus
Monodactylus argenteus

Scatophagidae

Scatophagus
Scatophagus argus

Gobiidae

Stigmatogobius
Stigmatogobius sadanundio

Brachygobius
Brachygobius doriae

Cryptocentrus
Cryptocentrus cinctus

Lythrypnus
Lythrypnus dalli

Nemateleotris
Nemateleotris decora
Nemateleotris magnifica

Thorogobius
Thorogobius ephippiatus

Toxotidae

Toxotes
Toxotes jaculator

Centrarchidae

Lepomis
Lepomis cyanellus
Lepomis gibbosus
Lepomis humilis
Lepomis macrochirus
Lepomis punctatus

Pomacentridae

Amphiprion
Amphiprion argenteus
Amphiprion frenatus
Amphiprion matejuelo
Amphiprion ocellaris
Amphiprion perideraion

Premnas
Premnas biaculeatus

Pomacanthidae

Centropyge
Centropyge argi
Centropyge bicolor
Centropyge bispinosa
Centropyge eibli
Centropyge loricula

Euxiphipops
Euxiphipops navarchus

Holacanthus
Holacanthus ciliaris
Holacanthus tricolor
Holacanthus trimaculatus

Pomacanthus
Pomacanthus annularis
Pomacanthus maculosus
Pomacanthus imperator
Pomacanthus paru
Pomacanthus semicirculatus

Pygoplites
Pygoplites diacanthus

Chaetodontidae

Chaetodon
Chaetodon auriga
Chaetodon lunula
Chaetodon quadrimaculatus
Chaetodon unimaculatus
Chaetodon decussatus

Chelmon
Chelmon rostratus

Forcipiger
Forcipiger longriostris

Heniochus
Heniochus acuminatus

Pomacentridae

Neoglyphidodon
Neoglyphidodon oxyodon

Abudefduf
Abudefduf saxatilis

Chromis
Chromis cyaneae
Chromis chromis
Chromis viridis

Chrysiptera
Chrysiptera parasema

Dascyllus
Dascyllus aruanus
Dascyllus carneus
Dascyllus melanurus
Dascyllus trimaculatus

Microspathodon
Microspathodon chrysurus

Pomacentrus
Pomacentrus alleni
Pomacentrus caeruleus

Stegastes
Stegastes planifrons

Acanthuridae

Acanthurus
Acanthurus glaucopareius
Acanthurus leucosternon

Naso
Naso literatus

Paracanthurus
Paracanthurus hepatus

Zebrasoma
Zebrasoma flavescens
Zebrasoma xanthurum

Labridae

Bodianus
Bodianus rufus
Bodianus puchellus

Coris
Coris aygula
Coris gaimard

Gomphosus
Gomphosus varius

Labroides
Labroides phthirophagus
Labroides dimidiatus

Choerodon
Choerodon fasciatus

Thalassoma
Thalassoma lunare

Centrolabrus
Centrolabrus exoleta
Centrolabrus melops

Labrus
Labrus bergylta

Serranidae

Anthias
Anthias squamipinnis

Chromileptes
Chromileptes altivelis

Gramma
Gramma loreto

Ephippidae

Platax
Platax orbicularis

Apogonidae

Apogon
Apogon notopterus

Blenniidae

Escenius
Escenius bicolor

Meiacanthus
Meiacanthus smithii

Blennius
Blennius gattorugine

Lipophrys
Lipophrys pholis

Pomadasyidae

Anisotremus
Anisotremus virginicus

Cirrhitidae

Oxycirrhites
Oxycirrhites typus

Opisthognathidae

Opisthognathus
Opistognathus aurifrons

Callionymidae

Synchiropus
Synchiropus splendidus

Siganidae

Siganus
Siganus vulpinus

Haemulidae

Plectorhynchus
Plectorhinchus chaetodonoides
Plectorhinchus orientalis

Zanclidae

Zanclus
Zanclus canescens

Stichaeidae

Chirolophis
Chirolophis ascanii

Gobiesocidae

Lepadogaster
Lepadogaster candollei

Pholidae

Pholis
Pholis gunnellus

Cyprinodontiformes

Cyprinodontidae

Aphanius
Aphanius dispar

Aphyosemion
Aphyosemion amieti
Aphyosemion australe
Aphyosemion bivittatum
Aphyosemion gardneri
Aphyosemion sjoestedti
Aphyosemion striatum
Aphyosemion walkeri

Aplocheilus
Aplocheilus dayi

Cynolebias
Cynolebias bokermani
Cynolebias nigripinnis

Epiplatys
Epiplatys fasciolatus

Jordinella
Jordinella floridae

Pachypanchax
Pachypanchax playfairii

Pseudoepiplatys
Pseudoepiplatys annulatus

Poeciliidae

Alfaro
Alfaro cultratus

Brachyrgaphis
Brachyrhaphis roseni

Gambusia
Gambusia affinis

Heterandria
Heterandria bimaculata
Heterandria formosa

Poecilia
Poecilia nigrofasciata
Poecilia reticulata
Poecilia latipinna

Xiphorus
Xiphorus neuzalanahotl

Xiphophorus
Xiphophorus helleri
Xiphophorus maculatus
Xiphophorus variatus

Goodeidae

Allotoca
Allotoca dugesi

Amecca
Amecca splendens

Characodon
Characodon audax

Skiffia
Skiffia francesae x multipunctatus

Xenotoca
Xenotoca eiseni

Siluriformes

Doradidae

Acanthodoras
Acanthodoras spinosissimus

Agamyxis
Agamyxis pectinifrons

Amblydoras
Amblydoras hancocki

Loricariidae

Ancistrus
Ancistrus temmincki

Farlowella
Farlowella acus

Hypostomus
Hypostomus multiradiatus

Otocinclus
Otocinclus affinis

Panaque
Panaque suttoni

Peckoltia
Peckoltia pulcher

Rineloricaria
Rineloricaria species

Auchenipteridae

Auchenipterichthys
Auchenipterichthys thoracatus

Aspredinidae

Bunocephalus
Bunocephalus kneri

Callichthyidae

Callichthys
Callichthys callichthys

Dianema
Dianema longibarbis
Dianema urostriata

Hoplosternum
Hoplosternum thoracatum

Brochis
Brochis splendens

Corydoras
Corydoras aeneus
Corydoras barbatus
Corydoras elegans
Corydoras haraldshultzi
Corydoras leucomelas
Corydoras napoensis
Corydoras paleatus

Claroteidae

Chrysichthys
Chrysichthys ornatus

Leiocassis
Leiocassis siamensis

Mystus
Mystus tengara

Clariidae

Clarias
Clarias batrachus

Schilbeidae

Eutropiellus
Eutropiellus debauwi

Siluridae

Kryptopterus
Kryptopterus bicirrhis

Pimelodidae

Phractocephalus
Phractocephalus hemioliopterus

Pimelodus
Pimelodus ornatus

Pseudopimelodus
Pseudopimelodus raninus raninus

Pseudoplatystoma
Pseudoplatystoma fasciata

Mochokidae

Synodontis
Synodontis angelicus
Synodontis contractus

Atheriniformes

Atherinidae

Bedotia
Bedotia geayi

Telmatherina
Telmatherina ladigesi

Brachygobius
Brachygobius doriae

Melanotaeniidae

Glossolepis
Glossolepis incisus

Iriatherina
Iriatherina werneri

Melanotaenia
Melanotaenia boesemani
Melanotaenia herbertaxelrodi
Melanotaenia lacustris
Melanotaenia maccullochi
Melanotaenia splendida
Melanotaenia fluviatilis

Osteoglossiformes

Mormyridae

Gnathonemus
Gnathonemus petersi

Notopteridae

Notopterus
Notopterus chitala

Pantodontidae

Pantodon
Pantodon buchholzi

Osteoglossidae

Scleropages
Scleropages jardinii

Lepisosteiformes

Lepisosteidae

Lepisosteus
Lepisosteus osseus

Synbranchiformes

Mastacembelidae

Mastacembelus
Mastacembelus armatus
Mastacembelus circumcinctus
Mastacembelus erythrotaenia

Beloniformes

Adrianichthyidae

Oryzias
Oryzias melastigma

Belonidae

Xenentodon
Xenentodon cancila

Hemiramphidae

Dermogenys
Dermogenys pusillus

Gasterosteiformes

Gasterosteidae

Gasterosteus
Gasterosteus aculeatus

Spinachia
Spinachia spinachia

Tetraodontiformes

Balistidae

Balistoides
Balistoides conspicillum

Balistes
Balistes vetula

Odonus
Odonus niger

Pseudobalistes
Pseudobalistes fuscus

Rhinecanthus
Rhinecanthus aculeatus

Ostraciidae

Lactoria
Lactoria cornuta

Ostracion
Ostracion meleagris

Monacanthidae

Chaetoderma
Chaetoderma penicilligera

Pervagor
Pervagor melanocephalus

Diodontidae

Diodon
Diodon holocanthus

Tetraodontidae

Canthigaster
Canthigaster margaritata
Canthigaster valentini

Scorpaeniformes

Scorpaenidae

Pterois
Pterois radiata
Pterois volitans

Scorpaena
Scorpaena species

Triglidae

Enophrys
Enophrys bubalis

Agonidae

Agonus
Agonus cataphractus

Cyclopteridae

Cyclopterus
Cyclopterus lumpus

Anguilliformes

Muraenidae

Echidna
Echidna nebulosa
Echidna polyzona

Muraena
Muraena lentiginosa

Rhinomuraena
Rhinomuraena amboinensis

Syngnathiformes

Syngnathidae

Dunckerocampus
Dunckerocampus dactyliophorus

Sygnathoides
Syngnathoides biaculeatus

Hippocampus
Hippocampus kuda
Hippocampus erectus

Centriscidae

Aeoliscus
Aeoliscus strigatus

Beryciformes

Holocentridae

Holocentrus
Holocentrus diadema

Myripristis
Myripristis murdjan

Mugiliformes

Mugilidae

Mugil
Mugil labrosus

References

Lists of fishes
Fishkeeping